The Mirage 27 (Schmidt) is a Canadian sailboat, that was designed by Peter Schmitt and first built in 1975. The design is out of production.

Production
The boat was built by Mirage Yachts in Canada starting in 1975. It is not related to the later Mirage 27 designed by Robert Perry, another design built by Mirage under the same name.

Design

The Mirage 27 is a small recreational keelboat, built predominantly of fibreglass. It has a masthead sloop rig, an internally-mounted, spade-type rudder and a fixed fin keel.

See also
List of sailing boat types

Similar sailboats
Aloha 27
Cal 27
Cal 2-27
Cal 3-27
Catalina 27
Catalina 270
Catalina 275 Sport
C&C 27
Crown 28
CS 27
Edel 820
Express 27
Fantasia 27
Halman Horizon
Hotfoot 27
Hullmaster 27
Hunter 27
Hunter 27-2
Hunter 27-3
Irwin 27 
Island Packet 27
Mirage 27 (Perry)
Mirage 275
O'Day 272
Orion 27-2
Watkins 27
Watkins 27P

References

External links

Keelboats
1970s sailboat type designs
Sailing yachts
Sailboat type designs by Peter Schmidt
Sailboat types built by Mirage Yachts